The Webber International Warriors football program is a college football team that represents Webber International University in the NAIA Independent, a part of the National Association of Intercollegiate Athletics.  The team has had 2 head coaches since its first recorded football game in 2002. The current coach is Eric Potochney who first took the position for the 2021 season.

Key

Coaches

Notes

References

Lists of college football head coaches

Florida sports-related lists